Badminton School is an independent, boarding and day school for girls aged 3 to 18 years situated in Westbury-on-Trym, Bristol, England. Named after Badminton House in Clifton, Bristol, where it was founded, the school has been located at its current site since 1924 and consistently performs well in the government's league tables, particularly at A-Level.
In 2008 the school was ranked third in the Financial Times top 1,000 schools.

According to the Good Schools Guide, "The secret of the school's success is in its size and a good deal of individual attention."

School history 

Miriam Badock established a school for girls in 1858 at Badminton House in Clifton, Bristol. By 1898 it had become known as Miss Bartlett's School for Young Ladies.

The school developed a broad curriculum, and extracurricular activities, including sports, were encouraged which was unusual for the time. The school grew steadily in size, and in 1924 moved to the present site, under the headship of Beatrice May Baker (1876–1973). Baker, known as BMB, was fundamental in shaping Badminton's ethos and had a deep personal influence on individual pupils.
She encouraged the girls to be aware of world affairs and internationalism. A pioneer in many educational fields, she established Badminton as a much-admired progressive school. She insisted on the rights of young people to freedom of expression and encouraged a questioning approach to learning: "in chapel 'Jesus often had to share the stage with Lenin". The international outlook she pioneered continues today.

In 1958, the school celebrated its centenary with the opening of a new Science Centre by Countess Mountbatten of Burma. Dame Sybil Thorndike was president of the school at that time, and a new cantata called "The Crown of the Year" by Michael Tippett was specially commissioned to mark the event.

By the late 1960s, the progressive aspects of the school had all but vanished (Royston Lambert speech at Exeter University, 19 November 1971) and it had become a standard independent academic school.

Old Badmintonians 

Alumnae of the school are known as Old Badmintonians.

 Claire Bloom – actress
 Midge Bruford – (9 April 1902 – 1958)
 Mary Fedden – artist
 Indira Gandhi – Prime Minister of India (1966–77, 1980–84)
 Princess Haya Bint Al Hussein – daughter of King Hussein I of Jordan
 Charlotte Leslie – Conservative Party MP for Bristol North West, 2010–2017
 Phyllida Law – actress
 Dame Iris Murdoch – writer
 Rosamund Pike – actress
 Unity Spencer (1930–2017), British artist
 Shirley Teed – artist
 Polly Toynbee – journalist

References

External links 
 
 Profile on the ISC website

Boarding schools in Bristol
Girls' schools in Bristol
Private schools in Bristol
Member schools of the Girls' Schools Association
Educational institutions established in 1858
1858 establishments in England

Westbury-on-Trym
Grade II listed buildings in Bristol
Grade II listed educational buildings